House of Stairs is a lithograph print by the Dutch artist M. C. Escher first printed in November 1951. This print measures . It depicts the interior of a tall structure crisscrossed with stairs and doorways.

A total of 46 wentelteefje (imaginary creatures created by Escher) are crawling on the stairs. The wentelteefje has a long, armored body with six legs, humanoid feet, a parrot-like beak and eyes on stalks. Some are seen to roll in through doors, wound in a wheel shape and then unroll to crawl up the stairs, while others crawl down stairs and wind up to roll out. The wentelteefje first appeared earlier the same month in the lithograph Curl-up.

References
 

Works by M. C. Escher
1951 prints